Maria Teresa Torras (née Maria Teresa Recoder; Villacarlos, Menorca, 2 January 1927 – Caracas, 7 March 2009), was Venezuelan-nationalized Spanish artist specializing in sculpture, textiles and metalwork.

Individual exhibitions 
 2006, Síntesis Geométrica. Galería D’Museo, Caracas, Venezuela.
 2001, Lanzas Contra El tiempo. Galería D’Museo, Caracas, Venezuela.
 1998, “Código X”, Museo de Arte Contemporáneo de Caracas Sofía Imber, Caracas.
 1994, “Macabeos”, Galería de Arte Nacional, Caracas. “Torsos Fragmentados”, Galería UNO, Caracas.
 1990, “Testigos Silentes”, Museo de Bellas Artes, Caracas.
 1984, Sala Mendoza, Caracas. Museo de Arte Moderno “Mario Abreu”, Aragua.
 1979, “Tapices”, Galería de Arte/Contacto, Caracas.
 1976, Joyas, Galería de Arte/Contacto, Caracas.
 1973, Museo de Bellas Artes, San Juan de Puerto Rico. Joyas, Galería de Arte/Contacto, Caracas.
 1971, “Del Blanco al Negro” (Dibujos), Galería Track, Caracas.

Group exhibitions 

 1983, II Salón Michoacano Internacional del Tapiz en Miniatura, Morelia, Michoacán, México. 
 1983, II Bienal Nacional de Artes Visuales. Museo de Arte Contemporáneo de Caracas Sofía Imber. Caracas, Venezuela.
 1983, X Salón Nacional de las Artes del Fuego, Carabobo, Venezuela
 1983, XLI Salón Arturo Michelena, Carabobo, Venezuela
 1982, XL Salón Arturo Michelena, Ateneo de Valencia, Carabobo, Venezuela
 1982, I Salón Nacional de Esculturas, Museo de Barquisimeto, Lara.
 1981, 10e Biennale Internationale de la Tapisserie, Musée Cantonal des Beaux-Arts, Lausanne, Suiza. 
 1981, I Bienal de Arte Nacional, Caracas- Venezuela
 1981, IV Trienal de Tapicería “Fiber Arts and Designers”, Museo Central de Textiles, Lódz, Polonia.
 1978, “Tapices”, Maison de L’UNESCO, Paris, Francia. 
 1978, “Tapices”, Sala de la Gobernación del Distrito Federal, Caracas, Venezuela
 1977, Salón de Orfebrería, Museo Boggio, Caracas, Venezuela 
 1977, “Tapices”, Crucero Cultural por el Caribe.
 1976, IV Salón Nacional de Artes de Fuego, Carabobo, Venezuela
 1976, I Salón de Orfebrería, Museo Casa del Correo del Orinoco, Bolívar, Venezuela
 1975, “Tapices”, Universidad de Nebraska, Estados Unidos. 
 1975, Banco Central de Venezuela (Organizada por la UNESCO)
 1974, “Joyas de Venezuela” (ONU), Caracas-Venezuela 
 1974, II Salón nacional de Artes de Fuego, Caracas-Venezuela 
 1974, “Arte Venezolano”, Museo de Arte Moderno, Lima, Perú.
 1973, XXXI Salón Arturo Michelena, Ateneo de Valencia, Carabobo, Venezuela
 1972, XXX Salón Arturo Michelena, Ateneo de Valencia, Carabobo, Venezuela 
 1972, Sala Mendoza, Caracas-Venezuela 
 1969, VII Salón de Arte Actual, Barcelona, España 
 1969, Salón Nacional de Dibujo, Museo de Bellas Artes, Caracas, Venezuela 
 1969, XXX .

See also
Museo de Escultura al Aire Libre de Alcalá de Henares

References

1927 births
2009 deaths
People from Menorca
20th-century Spanish women artists
Spanish sculptors
Venezuelan women artists
Venezuelan sculptors